Elsa Carolina Labraña Pino (born 19 September 1974) is a Chilean political activist and current member of the Chilean Constitutional Convention.

Biography
Labraña is a social worker and member of a eco-feminist organization Colectivo de Mujeres de Curicó that addresses issues of gender violence and caring for the environment. She is also part of other social movements such as «NO+AFP», «No al TPP 11» and «Free Rivers and Seed Protection».

Controversies
Labraña gained notoriety when she faced to the Judge Carmen Gloria Valladares. Nevertheless, then Labraña said that was nothing against her (Valladares).

Among her proposals are to change the Chilean National Anthem and the flag, topics that she said at Mentiras Verdaderas, a program of the TV Channel La Red.

References

External links
 Profile at La Tercera

Living people
1974 births
Chilean activists
21st-century Chilean politicians
Members of the List of the People
Members of the Chilean Constitutional Convention